Influenza non-structural protein (NS1) is a homodimeric RNA-binding protein found in influenza virus that is required for viral replication. NS1 binds polyA tails of mRNA keeping them in the nucleus. NS1 inhibits pre-mRNA splicing by tightly binding to a specific stem-bulge of U6 snRNA.

References

Protein families